Clement Joseph Loughlin (November 15, 1892 – January 28, 1977) was a Canadian professional ice hockey defenceman who played hockey for the Victoria Cougars of the Pacific Coast Hockey Association and the Western Canada Hockey League, and the Detroit Cougars and Chicago Black Hawks of the National Hockey League. He was captain when the Victoria Cougars won the Stanley Cup in 1925. Clem Loughlin also coached the Chicago Black Hawks for three seasons starting with the 1934–35 season.

His younger brother Wilf Loughlin was also a professional hockey player and the two played together on the Victoria Aristocrats and Victoria Cougars teams in the PCHA.

Career statistics

Regular season and playoffs

Coaching record

Awards and achievements
 Allan Cup Championship – 1915 with the Winnipeg Monarchs
 PCHA Second All-Star Team – 1921, 1922 and 1923
 PCHA First All-Star Team – 1924
 Stanley Cup Championship – 1925 with the Victoria Cougars of the WCHL
 Honoured Member of the Manitoba Hockey Hall of Fame

References

External links

1892 births
1977 deaths
Canadian ice hockey coaches
Canadian ice hockey defencemen
Chicago Blackhawks coaches
Chicago Blackhawks players
Detroit Cougars players
Kitchener Millionaires players
Ice hockey people from Manitoba
London Panthers players
London Tecumsehs players
People from Westman Region, Manitoba
Portland Rosebuds players
Stanley Cup champions
Victoria Aristocrats players
Victoria Cougars (1911–1926) players
Winnipeg Monarchs players